1 Chronicles 19 is the nineteenth chapter of the Books of Chronicles in the Hebrew Bible or the First Book of Chronicles in the Old Testament of the Christian Bible. The book is compiled from older sources by an unknown person or group, designated by modern scholars as "the Chronicler", and had the final shape established in late fifth or fourth century BCE. This chapter records the account of David's wars against the neighboring nations, especially the Ammonites and the Arameans. The whole chapter belongs to the section focusing on the kingship of David (1 Chronicles 9:35 to 29:30).

Text
This chapter was originally written in the Hebrew language. It is divided into 19 verses.

Textual witnesses
Some early manuscripts containing the text of this chapter in Hebrew are of the Masoretic Text tradition, which includes the Aleppo Codex (10th century), and Codex Leningradensis (1008).

There is also a translation into Koine Greek known as the Septuagint, made in the last few centuries BCE, which extant ancient manuscripts include Codex Vaticanus (B; B; 4th century), Codex Sinaiticus (S; BHK: S; 4th century), Codex Alexandrinus (A; A; 5th century) and Codex Marchalianus (Q; Q; 6th century).

Old Testament references
: 
:.

David's messengers disgraced (19:1–9)

The death of a king, such as Nahash, the Ammonite, could signal then end of international arrangements with other kingdoms, so David wanted to confirm a good relationship with Nahash's successor, Hanun, but David's successive victories against the Philistines, Moabites, Edomites, and Arameans, made Hanun's counselors suspicious (verse 3). 1 Chronicles 19:4-8 and 2 Samuel 10:4-7 have a parallel in the Qumran (Dead Sea Scrolls)  text (4Q51; 4Q Samuela or 4QSama, dates from c. 200 BCE), which shows that the 'relationship between Samuel and Chronicles was not one of unilateral or unambiguous independence', with distinctive differences such as the spelling of "David" in the books of Samuel differs from that in the Chronicles and 4Q51 as well as some details in numbers.

Verse 6
When the Ammonites saw that they had become a stench to David, Hanun and the Ammonites sent one thousand talents of silver to hire chariots and horsemen from Aram Naharaim, Aram Maakah, and Zobah.
"Become a stench": that is "made themselves odious" (KJV) or "disgusting".
"Talents": literally "", a measurement of weight. The sum paid by the Ammonites (1,000 talents of silver, cf. 2 Chronicles 25:6) is mentioned only in the Chronicles which often note monetary matters.
"Aram-Naharaim": that is "Mesopotamia" (KJV) is listed here instead of Aram Beth-rehob in 2 Samuel 10:6, perhaps because it was no longer existed at the Chronicler's time, as the Chronicler also excludes "Tob".
"Zobah": written as "Zoba" in  2 Samuel 10:6.

Verse 7
So they hired thirty and two thousand chariots, and the king of Maachah and his people; who came and pitched before Medeba. And the children of Ammon gathered themselves together from their cities, and came to battle.
"Medeba": located c.  south-southwest of Rabbah (modern Amman), the capital of the Ammonites; not mention in 2 Samuel.

David defeated the Ammonites and Arameans (19:10–19)
This passage parallels 2 Samuel 10:9–19 with a few differences. The victory of David's army against the Arameans (Syrians) left the Ammonites isolated from their allies.

Verse 18
But the Arameans fled before Israel, and David killed seven thousand chariot drivers and forty thousand infantry men of the Arameans, and killed Shophak, the commander of the army.
 "40,000 infantry men": or "40,000 foot soldiers"; written as "40,000 horsemen" in 2 Samuel 10:18.
"Shophak": spelled as "Shobach" in 2 Samuel 10:18.

See also

Related Bible parts: 2 Samuel 10, 2 Samuel 11, 1 Chronicles 20

Notes

References

Sources

External links
 Jewish translations:
 Divrei Hayamim I - I Chronicles - Chapter 19 (Judaica Press) translation [with Rashi's commentary] at Chabad.org
 Christian translations:
 Online Bible at GospelHall.org (ESV, KJV, Darby, American Standard Version, Bible in Basic English)
 First Book of Chronicles Chapter 19. Bible Gateway

19